Luis Gatica (born February 25, 1961) is a Mexican actor, son of the Chilean singer Lucho Gatica and the Puerto Rican actress Mapita Cortés. He is the uncle of fellow actor Alfredo Gatica.

Biography
Luis Gatica was born in Veracruz, Mexico. He grew in a show business family. He is the son of Chilean singer Lucho Gatica and Puerto Rican actress Mapita Cortés; he is the nephew of Puerto Rican actress Mapy Cortés and second cousin of Puerto Rican actor, comedian and producer Paquito Cordero. Having celebrity relatives both in Mexico and in Puerto Rico, Gatica wanted to become a celebrity on his own since he was very young. Gatica participated in various theater plays and in some, not particularly notable, music groups as he grew. He struggled trying to follow in his parents' footsteps.

His first big break came in 1983, when he was hired by Televisa to act in La fiera, which is considered a contemporary classic among telenovelas. In 1984, he played Joel in Los años felices (The Happy Years).
This was followed by 1986's Marionetas (Puppets), where he played Jorge Linares.

Having obtained celebrity for the first time, Gatica tried his luck in the world of music, retiring from television from 1986 to 1994. Although his foray into the world of rock music was largely unsuccessful, he nevertheless kept active for those eight years, singing in many Mexican locations.

In 1994, he was offered a return to television, and he did so by participating in another Mexican classic, Marimar, playing Chuy. Gatica then made his film debut, when he participated in 1995's Tiempo de Muerte 2 (Time to Die 2).

Tiempo de Muerte 2 was followed by A sangre fría ("In cold blood") where he played Beto. In 1996, Gatica returned to acting in telenovelas, participating in La antorcha encendida (The burning torch), as Juan Foncerrada and in Mi querida Isabel (My beloved Isabel), where he played Ricardo.

He took one year off before returning to the screen in 1998, acting as Ruben in Cazador de cazadores (Hunter of hunters), an action movie. That same year, he participated as Patricio in Preciosa, another telenovela that was successful. That telenovela was followed by another one, La mentira (The Lie), where he personified Santiago.

Luis Gatica made one telenovela in 1999: in DKDA: Suenos de Juventud (DKDA: Dreams of Youth), he played Raul Arias.

Returning to the film industry in 2000, Gatica played Rodrigo Miranda in Cuenta saldada (Paid Debt).

His next work, however, was in a soap opera marred by general criticism by magazine and newspaper telenovela critics. Sin Pecado Concebido, where he played doctor Garduno, was not well received by the media, which doomed the show with tele-spectators, and the soap opera was not a success.

In 2002, Gatica joined other celebrities in the Big Brother reality show, in Mexico City.

Gatica began 2003 by participating in another telenovela: he played Jorge Esparza in Niña Amada Mía (Beloved girl of mine). This was followed by Clap! El lugar de tus sueños (Clap! the place of your dreams), where he played Rivadeneira, and by 2004's Rubí, where he acted as Cayetano.

In 2006, he acted in the telenovela produced by José Alberto Castro Codigo Postal, as Herman.
In 2008, he appeared in "En Nombre del Amor"
In 2014, he acted yet again in another telenovela produced by Roberto Gómez Fernandez El Color de la Pasión, as Ricardo Marquez.

In 2008, he appeared in "En Nombre del Amor"
In 2014, he acted yet again in another telenovela produced by Roberto Gómez Fernandez El Color de la Pasión, as Ricardo Marquez.

Television roles

See also
List of Chileans
List of Mexicans
List of Puerto Ricans

References

External links
 

1961 births
Living people
Mexican male film actors
Mexican male telenovela actors
Mexican male singers
Mexican people of Basque descent
Mexican people of Chilean descent
Mexican people of Puerto Rican descent
People from Veracruz (city)
Male actors from Veracruz